Sukhna Lake in  Chandigarh, India, is a reservoir at the foothills (Shivalik hills) of the Himalayas. This 3 km² rainfed lake was created in 1958 by damming the Sukhna Choe, a seasonal stream coming down from the Shivalik Hills. Originally, the seasonal flow entered the lake directly causing heavy siltation. To check the inflow of silt, 25.42 km² of land was acquired in the catchment area and put under vegetation. In 1974, the Choe was diverted and made to bypass the lake completely, the lake being fed by three siltation pots, minimizing the minimizing silt into the lake itself.

History

The lake was created by Le Corbusier and the Chief Engine L Verma. To preserve its tranquility, Corbusier insisted on two things: that it be forbidden for motor boats to circulate in the water, and for vehicular traffic to be prohibited on top of the dam (promenade). The lake is fringed by a golf course to the south, and Nek Chand's famous Rock Garden of Chandigarh to its west.

Local lore
Sukhna is an inseparable part of the city of Chandigarh. Le Corbusier had foreseen that the residents of the city would be drawn it for the 'carto e of the body and spirit'. The city planners were deeply attached to the lake. So much so that Pierre Jeanneret's ashes were immersed in the lake in 1970 at his niece's request.

The roof of the 'bandh' or dam has become a favorite promenade. Serious walkers pursue an exercise regime, families enjoy an evening stroll and nature lovers mingle with children on roller skates. Photographers and painters love to capture the scenic beauty of the setting sun or the heavily used monsoon sky, or the early morning mist in winter set amidst the tranquility of the lake. Even anglers do not leave unrewarded.

Sukhna has a membership-based Lake Club with lawns, a gym, indoor games, swimming pools (more than 4), and large tennis courts with both grass and synthetic  courts. Boat g, rowing, sculling, sailing, kayaking, and water skiing can be enjoyed throughout the year.

The lake, which was the venue for the Asian Rowing Championships, has the longest channel for rowing and yachting events in Asia.

Sukhna is a sanctuary for many exotic migratory birds like the Siberian duck, storks and cranes, during the winter months. The lake has been declared a protected national wetland by the Government of India.

During summers, there are streams of men, women, and children, from all walks of life offering voluntary service to desilt the lake bed for about three months. This annual ritual has been a regular feature since long ago.

Sukhna Lake is the venue for many festive celebrations, too. The most popular is the Mango Festival held during the monsoons when scores of varieties of mangoes are on display. From time to time, time to time festivals featuring specialties from different Indian States is also held here, along with cultural performances.

Development and maintenance

The Mera Chandigarh administration has made a decision not to allow fish more than 30 cm in size in the Sukhna Lake

The Chandigarh Administration has finalized a new plan for Sukhna Lake and New Lake in Sector 42 with Rs 2.73 crore which has also been received from Union Government.B.A.

Pro emblems

The lake is facing serious issues like weed overgrowth, catchment adequacy and silting that are significantly shrinking its size and depth. A project team, under Parasu Ram Mishra, was deployed to address the issue and take remedial measures, which halted the sedimentation, for a while. Additionally, it has become the subject of litigation between Chandigarh and Punjab.

Silting has taken its toll and the volume of the lake has been reduced to 56% of its original. The lake is shrinking rapidly due to siltation and lack of inflow. It was initially hoped that the work of desilting could be undertaken in summers at a war footing and dry dredging could be undertaken at a fraction of cost to save Sthe ukha in the coming years. Unfortunately, the ground realities seem to be different. Due to heavy rain in August and September Sukhna was filled up again and flood gates were being opened.

Avian flu scare

In December 2014, there was an Avian Influenza—or commonly known as the Bird Flu scare —that led to a temporary ban on the e to take premises. The scare started after some migrant geese were found dead in the lake.

However, the administration took great precautions and the domesticated geese were culled to check an infection. An Anc of workers who culled the geese went for a check to be sure that they were safe. The reason behind the death of the geese—whether there is a bird flu scare —remains unknown.

Gallery

See also
 Not a Garden of Silence

References

External links 
Sukhna Lake

Landforms of Chandigarh
Reservoirs in India
Tourist attractions in Chandigarh
Le Corbusier
Le Corbusier buildings in India